Gharib Mahalleh (also Romanized as Gharīb Maḩalleh) is a village in Asalem Rural District, Asalem District, Talesh County, Gilan Province, Iran. At the 2006 census, its population was 253, in 63 families.

References 

Populated places in Talesh County